Buyeo Gyogi (扶餘翹岐, ? – 677) was a prince of Baekje, one of the Three Kingdoms of Korea. He was the second son of the 30th king, Mu of Baekje and half-brother of the 31st king, Uija of Baekje.

In 642 he was exiled along with his mother and sister and 40 noblement to the islands of Japan. This was an attempt by the new king and his half-brother, Uija, to gain back power from the aristocracy but instead led to more resentment and political instability. What happened to Gyogi in Japan is mostly unknown.

Many of his other family members settled in Japan as well as his nephew, Zenkō (善光 or 禅広), who settled in Japan and was given the family name Kudara no Konikishi (百濟王; king of Baekje) by the emperor of Japan.

See also 
 Uija of Baekje
 Silla–Tang alliance
 History of Korea
 Three Kingdoms of Korea
 List of monarchs of Korea

Notes 

Year of birth missing
Baekje
Korean princes
Korean exiles
Year of death unknown